Colin Francis MacKinnon (July 20, 1810 – September 26, 1879) was a Canadian Roman Catholic Archbishop and founder of St. Francis Xavier University and Saint Ninian's Cathedral.

Biography
Born in William's Point,  in the County of Antigonish, Nova Scotia, the son of John MacKinnon and Eunice MacLeod, MacKinnon's father came to the United States from Eigg, Scotland in 1791 and soon settled in Nova Scotia.

MacKinnon travelled by sea through a terrible storm to Rome in 1828 to make his theological studies at the Pontifical Urbaniana University or Pontifical Urban University is a pontifical university under the authority of the Congregation for the Evangelization of Peoples. It is also known as The Collegio Urbano of Propaganda Fide.The university is located on the Janiculum Hill in Rome and has four faculties: the faculty of Theology, the faculty of Philosophy, the faculty of Canon Law, and the faculty of Missiology.

The origins of the university date back to Pope Urban VIII who  decided to establish the Urban College with his papal bull Immortalis Dei Filius (August 1, 1627). The Pontifical Urbaniana University was endowed with the title "Pontifical" with the motu proprio Fidei Propagandae of Pope John XXIII, on October 1, 1962. From its beginnings, the Urbaniana has always been an academic institution with a missionary character that has served the Catholic Church through the formation of missionaries and experts in the area of Missiology or other disciplines, necessary in the evangelizational activity of the Church.

MacKinnon was ordained priest by Archbishop Giacomo Filippo Fransoni on June 4, 1837. Returning to Nova Scotia, he was appointed the first resident pastor at St Andrews, Sydney County, Nova Scotia.

On November 9, 1851, he was appointed Bishop of Arichat by Pope Pius IX. On February 27, 1852 he was consecrated bishop by Bishop William Walsh, at St. Mary's Cathedral, Halifax and this was the first consecration of a Catholic bishop in Halifax. In 1853, he founded a seminary, St. Francis Xavier College, which grew into St. Francis Xavier University.

He resigned in 1877 and was then made an Archbishop. He died in 1879, aged 69.

References

Further reading
 A. A. Johnston, A History of the Catholic Church in Eastern Nova Scotia, Vol. II, St. Francis Xavier University Press, Antigonish, N.S., 1971.

External links
 

1810 births
1879 deaths
19th-century Roman Catholic bishops in Canada
Canadian people of Scottish descent
Roman Catholic bishops of Antigonish